Laken La() is a mountain pass at Damxung, north-west of Lhasa near the second-largest salt lake in Tibet: Namtso Lake.

Mountain passes of Tibet
Mountain passes of China
Transhimalayas